María Luisa Bombal Anthes (Viña del Mar, 8 June 1910 – 6 May 1980) was a Chilean novelist and poet. Her work incorporates erotic, surrealist, and feminist themes. She was a recipient of the Santiago Municipal Literature Award.

Biography
María Luisa was born in 1910 to Martín Bombal Videla and Blanca Anthes Precht.

As a child, Bombal attended the Catholic girls school Colegio de los Sagrados Corazones in Santiago. After her father's death in 1919, Bombal went with her mother and sisters to live in Paris, where she finished her studies at the Lycée privé Sainte-Geneviève. Bombal enrolled at the University of Paris, where she studied literature and philosophy. She also attended the Lycée La Bruyère and the Sorbonne, where she began to write. After Bombal completed her university studies, she returned to Chile in 1931, where she reunited with her family.

Bombal also studied violin with Jacques Thibaud and drama with Charles Dolan.

In 1938 Bombal published La amortajada, which earned her the Santiago Municipal Literature Award in 1941. While living in the United States, she wrote a novel in English, The House of Mist, which was a translation and extensive readaptation of her Spanish-language novel La última niebla. The House of Mist was later translated into Spanish by Lucía Guerra.

Personal life
Upon her return to South America from Paris in 1931 she had an intense romance with a pioneer in civil aviation, Eulogio Sánchez Errázuriz (1903–1956), who did not share her interest in literature. Sánchez would later distance himself from Bombal, causing her to suffer from depression; after Sánchez stopped responding to her letters, she attempted suicide by shooting herself during a social gathering at his apartment. In 1933, she married the homosexual painter Jorge Larco (1897–1967), forming with him a lavender marriage. With the help of friends, Bombal fled the country to Argentina, where in 1933 she met Jorge Luis Borges and Pablo Neruda in Buenos Aires. 

In 1937 she returned to Chile due to the beginning of a divorce trial. In January 1941 she acquired a revolver, went to the Hotel Crillón in Santiago and waited for Eulogio Sánchez, who almost did not remember her after not seeing her for eight years. When Bombal saw him, she shot him three times in the arm. She went to trial; however, Sánchez exempted her from all guilt, for which the judge acquitted her. Years later, on María Luisa's own words, she said that he ruined her life, however, she never forgot him. Later on, she moved to United States, where she married the French count, Raphäel de Saint-Phalle y Chabannes (1889–1969), with whom she had a daughter, Brigitte. She returned to South America in 1971; living first in Argentina (helped by Pablo Neruda, who was also living there), where she met important men of letters, and then in Viña del Mar, Chile. There, on 18 September 1976, Bombal again met Jorge Luis Borges.

Death 
Bombal lived her final years in Chile. She became an alcoholic, which led to cirrhosis. Bombal died on May 6, 1980, in Santiago, as a result of gastrointestinal bleeding.

Distinction between femininity and masculinity in her works 
Bombal wrote distinctly for her male and female characters. Bombal viewed femininity as a symbol of uniqueness; more related to nature, emotions and intuition; very different from how she depicts masculinity, where men are described as stronger and wiser, at the moment of facing problems.

Selected works 
Novels

 La última niebla (1934)
 La amortajada (1938)
 The House of Mist (1947, English readaptation of La última niebla)
 The Shrouded Woman (1947, English readaptation of La amortajada)

Stories

 Las islas nuevas (1939)
 El árbol (1939)
 Trenzas (1940)
 Lo secreto (1944)
 La historia de María Griselda (1946)

Chronicles

 Mar, cielo y tierra (1940)
 Washington, ciudad de las ardillas (1940)
 La maja y el ruiseñor (1960)

Other writings

 Reseña cinematográfica de Puerta cerrada (1939)
 En Nueva York con Sherwood Anderson (entrevista) (1939)
 Inauguración del sello Pauta (1973)
 Discurso en la Academia Chilena de la Lengua (1977)

References

Further reading
Pérez Firmat, Gustavo. Tongue Ties: Logo-Eroticism in Anglo-Hispanic Literature. Palgrave, 2003.

1910 births
1980 deaths
Chilean people of French descent
Chilean people of German descent
People from Viña del Mar
Chilean women novelists
20th-century Chilean women writers
20th-century Chilean novelists